This is a timeline of the Black Power movement.

Before 1966
 Congress of Racial Equality (1942)
 COINTELPRO (1956)
 Student Nonviolent Coordinating Committee (1960)
 Assassination of Patrice Lumumba (1961)
 1961 United Nations floor protest
 The Negro Digest (1961)
 Liberator (1961)
 Group on Advanced Leadership (1961)
 Umbra (1963)
 Revolutionary Action Movement (1962)
 Umbra (1963)
 Soulbook (1964)
 Black Arts Movement (1965)
 Watts riots (1965)
 Assassination of Malcolm X (1965)
 The Autobiography of Malcolm X (1965)
 Black Dialogue (1965)
 US Organization (1965)

1966
 Black Panther Party
 Black Guerrilla Family
 Journal of Black Poetry
 Kwanzaa

1967
 Operation CHAOS
 Long hot summer of 1967
 Detroit riot of 1967
 Cambridge riot of 1967
 Cairo riot
 Where Do We Go from Here: Chaos or Community?

1968
 Memphis sanitation strike
 1968 Olympics Black Power salute
 Republic of New Afrika
 Death of Bobby Hutton
 Omnibus Crime Control and Safe Streets Act of 1968
 Dodge Revolutionary Union Movement
 Assassination of Martin Luther King, Jr.
 Howard University student protest
 King assassination riots
 Baltimore
 Wilmington
 Louisville
 Kansas City, Missouri
 Pittsburgh
 Chicago
 Washington, D.C.
 Nommo

1969
 Murder of Fred Hampton
 Murder of Mark Clark
 League of Revolutionary Black Workers
 Institute of the Black World
 Sullivan v. Little Hunting Park, Inc.
 Weather Underground
 Gaston County v. United States
 Executive Order 11478
 Alexander v. Holmes County Board of Education
 1969 York race riot
 Allen v. State Board of Election
 Revised Philadelphia Plan
 Wells v. Rockefeller
 National Conference of Black Political Scientists
 Soul City, North Carolina

1970
 Joint Center for Political Studies
 Black Liberation Army
 Black Creation
 Revolutionary People's Constitutional Convention
 Marin County courthouse incident
 Killing of Henry Marrow
 Comprehensive Drug Abuse Prevention and Control Act of 1970
 Jackson State killings
 Voting Rights Act Amendments of 1970
 Carter v. West Feliciana School Board
 Institute for Southern Studies

1971
 Congressional Black Caucus
 War on Drugs
 Griggs v. Duke Power Co.
 Swann v. Charlotte-Mecklenburg Board of Education
 Attica Prison riot
 Operation PUSH

1972
 National Black Political Convention
 Coalition of Black Trade Unionists
 Gary Agenda
 African Liberation Day
 Gates v. Collier
 1972 Olympics Black Power salute
 MOVE

1973
 National Black Feminist Organization
 Revolutionary Suicide
 Drug Enforcement Administration
 Georgia v. United States
 District of Columbia Home Rule Act
 Keyes v. School District No. 1, Denver
 White v. Regester
 Equal Employment Opportunity Act of 1972

1974
 The National Conference of Black Mayors
 Gates v. Collier
 Boston busing desegregation
 Equal Educational Opportunities Act of 1974
 Equal Credit Opportunity Act
 Milliken v. Bradley
 Maynard Jackson

1975
 George Jackson Brigade
 Home Mortgage Disclosure Act
 Livernois–Fenkell riot
 Voting Rights Act Amendments of 1975

After 1975
 Post–civil rights era

See also
 Garveyism
 Race (human classification)
 White supremacy
 Jim Crow
 White Panther Party (1968)

African and Black nationalism
Black Power